Serhiy Yuriyovych Shyshchenko (born 13 January 1976) is a retired professional footballer and a football manager.

Career
Shyshchenko played for teams like FC Metalurh Donetsk, FC Metalurh Zaporizhzhya, FC Kryvbas Kryvyi Rih, FC Olympik Kharkiv, FC Metalist Kharkiv, FC Shakhtar Donetsk, and FC Nyva Ternopil. In the summer of 2008, Shyshchenko moved back to Metalurh Donetsk.

Shyshchenko made 14 appearances for the Ukraine national football team from 2001 to 2005.

References

External links
 
 
 

1976 births
Living people
Ukrainian footballers
Ukraine international footballers
Ukrainian Premier League players
Ukrainian Second League players
FC Shakhtar Donetsk players
FC Shakhtar-2 Donetsk players
FC Nyva Ternopil players
FC Metalurh Donetsk players
FC Metalurh-2 Donetsk players
FC Chornomorets Odesa players
FC Baltika Kaliningrad players
Ukrainian expatriate footballers
Expatriate footballers in Russia
Ukrainian expatriate sportspeople in Russia
Russian Premier League players
FC Mariupol players
FC Kryvbas Kryvyi Rih players
FC Metalist Kharkiv players
FC Metalurh Zaporizhzhia players
FC Metalurh-2 Zaporizhzhia players
Ukrainian football managers
Ukrainian Premier League top scorers
FC Olympik Kharkiv players
FC Bukovyna Chernivtsi managers
Association football midfielders
MFC Mykolaiv managers
FC Polissya Zhytomyr managers
Ukrainian First League managers
Sportspeople from Kharkiv Oblast